The 2020 All Stars match day was an annual pre-season fixture of Men's and Women's All Stars matches of Australian rugby league. Both games were played on 22 February 2020 at Queensland's Cbus Super Stadium, the original venue the fixture was first played at. The matches were played between the Indigenous All Stars and the Māori All Stars.

Men's All Stars match 
This was the Ninth Men's All Star Game

Teams 

1 - Ryan James was originally selected to play but withdrew due to injury. He was replaced by Jamayne Taunoa-Brown.
2 - Andrew Fifita was originally selected to play but withdrew due to injury. Josh Kerr was moved from the bench to Prop and Andrew Fifita was replaced by Zac Saddler.
3 - Cody Walker was originally selected to play but withdrew due to injury. Jack Wighton was moved from Centre to Five-eighth, Cody Walker was replaced by Tyrell Fuimaono and the captaincy of the Indigenous All Stars was handed to Joel Thompson.
4 - Adam Elliott was originally selected to play but withdrew due to injury. He was replaced by Chris Smith.
5 - Bailey Simonsson was originally selected to play but withdrew. He was replaced by Bryson Goodwin.
6 - Nelson Asofa-Solomona was originally selected to play but withdrew due to injury. He was replaced by Jordan Riki.
7 - James Tamou was originally selected to play but withdrew due to injury. He was replaced by Pasami Saulo.

Result

Women's All Stars match 
For the eighth time, a Women's All Stars match was held on 22 February 2020.

Teams

Result

References

All Stars match
Rugby league on the Gold Coast, Queensland
NRL All Stars match